Hermann Foertsch (4 April 1895 – 27 December 1961) was a German general during World War II who held commands at the divisional, corps and army levels. He was a recipient of the Knight's Cross of the Iron Cross of Nazi Germany. 

Foertsch was tried at the Hostages Trial in 1947. The trial resulted in Foertsch's acquittal because he was a staff officer at the time that the criminal orders were transmitted.

Hostages trial

As a chief of staff for several generals commanding Wehrmacht forces in occupied Greece and Yugoslavia, Foertsch passed on orders to subordinate units to take hostages or conduct reprisals. These orders were deemed criminal by the Tribunal, but staff officers were not considered culpable unless they drafted such criminal orders or made a special effort to distribute them to the troops that carried them out. Citing a lack of evidence of a commission of an unlawful act, the Tribunal acquitted Foertsch of war crimes.

Later life
After his acquittal, Foertsch collaborated with Hans Speidel in the development of concepts for Germany's rearmament many years before the official foundation of the Bundeswehr, the German army, in 1955. In 1950, Foertsch was the leading member of the select group of former Wehrmacht high-ranking officers invited by Chancellor Konrad Adenauer to take part in the conference to discuss West Germany's rearmament (Wiederbewaffnung). The conference resulted in the Himmerod memorandum that contributed to the myth of the "clean Wehrmacht". Foertsch was involved in the establishment of the European anti-communist organisation Interdoc.

Awards and decorations

 Knight's Cross of the Iron Cross on 27 August 1944 as Generalleutnant and commander of 21. Infanterie-Division

Works

 York. Das Leben eines altpreußischen Generals., Verlag: Coleman, Lübeck, 1932
 Wehrmacht und öffentliche Meinung, Verlag nicht ermittelbar, 1933
 Der deutsche Soldat. - Leipzig: Seemann, 1934
 Im gleichen Schritt und Tritt! Das tönende Buch vom deutschen Heer, Verlag: Knorr & Hirth, München, 1934
 Die Wehrmacht im nationalsozialistischen Staat. Broschek, 1935
 Unsere deutsche Wehrmacht. - Berlin: Zeitgeschichte-Verl., 1935
 Der Offizier der neuen Wehrmacht - Eine Pflichtenlehre. - Berlin: Eisenschmidt, 1936.
 Wehrpflicht-Fibel., Verlag "Offene Worte", 1937
 Schuld und Verhängnis – Die Fritsch-Krise im Frühjahr 1938 als Wendepunkt in der nationalsozialistischen Zeit. DVA, 1951
 Grundzüge der Wehrpolitik., Hanseatische Verlagsanstalt, 1938 
 Kriegskunst heute und morgen. - Berlin: Zeitgeschichte-Verl., 1939
 Der Offizier der deutschen Wehrmacht. - Berlin: Eisenschmidt, 1940
 Psychologische Kriegführung: Vortrag, Evang. Akademie, 1953

English:
 The Art of Modern Warfare, Veritas Press, 1940
 My Opinions with Regard to Reports 1, Historical Division, Headquarters United States Army, 1947
 Basic Concepts and Organization for the Conduct of War Prior to World War II, United States, Department of the Army, 1948

Italian:
 L'arte della guerra di oggi e di domani.", Nicola Zanichelli Editore, Bologna,, 1940

See also
List of Axis personnel indicted for war crimes

References

Citations

Bibliography

 
 
 Scott-Smith, Giles. Interdoc and West European Psychological Warfare: The American Connection. Intelligence and National Security Vol. 26, Nos. 2–3, 355–376, April–June 2011.
 

1895 births
1961 deaths
People from Wałcz County
People from West Prussia
German Army generals of World War II
Generals of Infantry (Wehrmacht)
German Army personnel of World War I
Prussian Army personnel
Recipients of the Gold German Cross
Recipients of the Knight's Cross of the Iron Cross
German anti-communists
German prisoners of war in World War II held by the United States
People acquitted of international crimes
Yugoslavia in World War II
People acquitted by the United States Nuremberg Military Tribunals
Reichswehr personnel
Recipients of the clasp to the Iron Cross, 1st class
Himmerod meeting participants
20th-century Freikorps personnel